Xiayunling Township is a township located inside of Fangshan District, Beijing, China. It borders Qingshui, Shijaiying and Fozizhuang Towns in its north, Nanjiao and Zhoukoudian Towns in its east, Hancunhe, Zhangfang and Shidu Towns in its south, Puwa and Beibianqiao Towns in its west. In 2020, the population of Xiayunling was 4,885.

History

Administrative Divisions 

In the year 2021, there were 15 villages within Xiayunling Township:

Climate 

Xiayunling Township has a humid continental climate (Köppen climate classification Dwa).

See also 
 List of township-level divisions of Beijing

References 

Fangshan District
Township-level divisions of Beijing